Gary Richard is a former defensive back in the National Football League (NFL).

Biography
Richard was born Gary Ross Richard on October 9, 1965 in Denver, Colorado.

Career
Richard was drafted in the seventh round of the 1988 NFL Draft by the Green Bay Packers and spent that season with the team. He played at the collegiate level at the University of Pittsburgh.

See also
List of Green Bay Packers players

References

1965 births
Living people
American football cornerbacks
Green Bay Packers players
Players of American football from Denver
Pittsburgh Panthers football players
San Antonio Riders players